The 1996 Philippine Basketball Association (PBA) rookie draft was an event at which teams drafted players from the amateur ranks. The annual rookie draft was held on January 21 at the New World Hotel in Makati. It was the last draft held in a hotel, as the draft venues were held inside shopping malls.

Round 1

Round 2

Round 3

Round 4

Round 5

References

Philippine Basketball Association draft
draft